Central Pulse are a New Zealand netball team based in Wellington. Between 2008 and 2016, they played in the ANZ Championship. Since 2017 they have represented Netball Central in the ANZ Premiership. Netball Central is the governing body that represents the Hawke's Bay, Manawatū-Whanganui, Taranaki and Wellington Regions. Pulse were 2019, 2020 and 2022 ANZ Premiership winners. They also won the 2018 Netball New Zealand Super Club tournament.

History

Formation 
Central Pulse were formed in 2007. The new team was effectively a merger of two former National Bank Cup teams, Capital Shakers and Western Flyers. Pulse subsequently became founder members of the ANZ Championship. The former Australia head coach, Jill McIntosh was appointed director of coaching, Singapore head coach, Kate Carpenter, was appointed head coach and England international, Sonia Mkoloma, became the team's first player.

ANZ Championship
Between 2008 and 2016, Central Pulse played in the ANZ Championship. On 5 April 2008, Pulse hosted the very first ANZ Championship match at the TSB Bank Arena, losing 33–50 to Melbourne Vixens. During the early ANZ Championship era, Pulse struggled to establish themselves both on and off the court. In 2008, Pulse suffered a winless season. The only point they gained was by default. In their Round 10 match against West Coast Fever, a leaky roof at Challenge Stadium saw the match called off and declared a draw. Each team received one point. Carpenter was subsequently replaced as head coach by Yvette McCausland-Durie. 

Meanwhile, off the court, Pulse lost their main sponsor after just one season and needed financial bailouts from both Netball New Zealand and the league itself. Ahead of the 2009 season, Pulse found themselves fined for missing the deadline to announce their squad. There was also speculation that Netball New Zealand wanted to use the franchise as a development team for New Zealand under-21 players. After 24 games, Pulse eventually won their first ever match when they defeated New South Wales Swifts 53–52 in a 2009 Round 13 match at the Te Rauparaha Arena.

Pulse enjoyed their best season during the ANZ Championship era in 2013, when with a team coached by Robyn Broughton, captained by Katrina Grant and featuring Joline Henry, Caitlin Thwaites and Donna Wilkins, they won eight matches and finished fifth.

Regular season statistics

ANZ Premiership 
Since 2017, Pulse have played in the ANZ Premiership. During the early ANZ Premiership era, they emerged as one of the leagues strongest teams. Between 2017 and 2020, with a team coached by Yvette McCausland-Durie, captained by Katrina Grant and featuring, among others, Karin Burger, Ameliaranne Ekenasio and Claire Kersten, Pulse played in four successive grand finals. Between 2018 and 2020 they won three successive minor premierships. Pulse were the 2019 and 2020 overall champions. They also won the 2018 Netball New Zealand Super Club tournament.  

Regular season statistics

Grand finals
ANZ Premiership

Netball New Zealand Super Club

Home venues
Pulse's main venue is Wellington's TSB Bank Arena. They have also regularly played home matches at Porirua's Te Rauparaha Arena and at the Fly Palmy Arena in Palmerston North.

Notable players

2023 squad

Internationals

 Rachel Rasmussen

 Jane Altschwager
 Kristiana Manu'a
 Chelsea Pitman
 Caitlin Thwaites

 Ama Agbeze
 Sara Bayman
 Sonia Mkoloma
 Chelsea Pitman

 Susan Tagicakibau
 Kelera Nawai

 Victoria Smith

 Althea Byfield

 Joyce Mvula

 Cathrine Latu
 Ainsleyana Puleiata
 Rachel Rasmussen
 Frances Solia
 Saviour Tui

 Irene van Dyk

Captains

Award winners

ANZ Championship awards
ANZ Championship MVP

Notes
  Romelda Aiken and Sonia Mkoloma shared the 2008 award.

New Zealand Netball Awards
ANZ Premiership Player of the Year

Coaches

Head coaches

Assistant coaches

Main sponsors

Reserve team

Since 2016, Netball Central have also entered a team in the National Netball League. They are effectively the reserve team of Central Pulse. Between 2016 and 2018 they played as Central Zone. Since 2019, they have played as Central Manawa. Between 2017 and 2019, Central Zone/Central Manawa won three successive NNL titles. In 2022, Central Manawa won a fourth title.

Honours

ANZ Premiership
Winners: 2019, 2020, 2022 
Runners Up: 2017
Minor premiers: 2018, 2019, 2020, 2022
Netball New Zealand Super Club
Winners: 2018

References

External links
 Official website
  Central Pulse on Facebook
  Central Pulse on Twitter

 
ANZ Premiership teams
ANZ Championship teams
Netball teams in New Zealand
Sports clubs established in 2007
2007 establishments in New Zealand
Sport in Wellington